Dudley Stuart John Moore CBE (19 April 193527 March 2002) was an English actor, comedian, musician and composer. Moore first came to prominence in the UK as a leading figure in the British satire boom of the 1960s. He was one of the four writer-performers in the comedy revue Beyond the Fringe from 1960 that created a boom in satiric comedy, and with a member of that team, Peter Cook, collaborated on the BBC television series Not Only... But Also. As a popular double act, Moore’s buffoonery contrasted with Cook’s deadpan monologues. They jointly received the 1966 British Academy Television Award for Best Entertainment Performance. They worked together on other projects until the mid 1970s, by which time Moore had settled in Los Angeles to concentrate on his film acting.

His career as a comedy film actor was marked by hit films, particularly Bedazzled (1967), set in Swinging Sixties London (in which he co-starred with Cook) and Hollywood productions Foul Play (1978), 10 (1979) and Arthur (1981). For Arthur, Moore was nominated for the Academy Award for Best Actor and won a Golden Globe Award. He received a second Golden Globe for his performance in Micki & Maude (1984). Moore was awarded a star on the Hollywood Walk of Fame in 1987, and was made a CBE by Queen Elizabeth II at Buckingham Palace on 16 November 2001 in what was his last public appearance.

Early life
Moore was born at the original Charing Cross Hospital in central London, the son of Ada Francis (née Hughes), a secretary, and John Moore, a railway electrician from Glasgow. 
He had an older sister, Barbara. Moore was brought up in the Becontree estate in Dagenham, Essex. This made him the butt of jokes from other children. His right foot responded well to corrective treatment by the time he was six, but his left foot was permanently twisted and his left leg below the knee was withered. He remained self-conscious about this throughout his life.

Moore became a chorister at the age of six. At age 11 he earned a scholarship to the Guildhall School of Music, where he took up harpsichord, organ, violin, musical theory and composition. He rapidly developed into a highly talented pianist and organist and was playing the organ at local church weddings by the age of 14. He attended Dagenham County High School where he received dedicated musical tuition from Peter Cork (1926–2012), who helped him towards his Oxford music scholarship. (Norma Winstone was another student of Cork's at Dagenham). Cork was also a composer. Moore kept in touch until the mid-1990s and his letters to Cork were published in 2006.

Moore won an organ scholarship to Magdalen College, Oxford, where he was tutored by the composer Bernard Rose. While studying music and composition there, he also performed with Alan Bennett in The Oxford Revue. During his university years, Moore developed a love of jazz music and became an accomplished jazz pianist and composer. He began working with musicians such as John Dankworth and Cleo Laine. In 1960 he left Dankworth's band to work on Beyond the Fringe.

Career

Beyond the Fringe

John Bassett, a graduate of Wadham College, Oxford recommended Moore, his jazz bandmate and a rising cabaret talent, to producer Robert Ponsonby, who was putting together a comedy revue entitled Beyond the Fringe. Bassett also chose Jonathan Miller. Moore then recommended Alan Bennett, who in turn suggested Peter Cook.

Beyond the Fringe was at the forefront of the 1960s UK satire boom, although the show's original runs in Edinburgh and the provinces in 1960 had had a lukewarm response. When the revue transferred to the Fortune Theatre in London, in a revised production by Donald Albery and William Donaldson, it became a sensation, thanks in some part to a favourable review by Kenneth Tynan. There were also a number of musical items in the show, using Dudley Moore's music, most famously an arrangement of the Colonel Bogey March in the style of Beethoven, which Moore appears unable to bring to an end.

In 1962 the show transferred to the John Golden Theatre in New York, with its original cast. President John F. Kennedy attended a performance on 10 February 1963. The show continued in New York until 1964.

Partnership with Peter Cook
When Moore returned to the UK he was offered his own series on the BBC, Not Only... But Also (1965, 1966, 1970). It was commissioned specifically as a vehicle for Moore, but when he invited Peter Cook on as a guest, their comedy partnership was so notable that it became a permanent fixture of the series. Cook and Moore are most remembered for their sketches as two working-class men, Pete and Dud, in macs and cloth caps, commenting on politics and the arts, but they also fashioned a series of one-off characters, usually with Moore in the role of interviewer to one of Cook's upper-class eccentrics.

The pair developed an unorthodox method for scripting the material, using a tape recorder to tape an ad-libbed routine that they would then have transcribed and edited. This would not leave enough time to fully rehearse the script, so they often had a set of cue cards. Moore was famous for "corpsing" so, as the programmes often went out live, Cook would deliberately make him laugh in order to get an even bigger reaction from the studio audience. The BBC wiped much of the series, though some of the soundtracks (which were issued on LP record) have survived. In 1968 Cook and Moore briefly switched to ATV for four one-hour programmes entitled Goodbye Again; however, they were not as critically well-received as the BBC shows.

On film, Moore and Cook appeared in the 1966 British comedy film The Wrong Box, before co-writing and co-starring in Bedazzled (1967) with Eleanor Bron. Set in Swinging London of the 1960s, Bedazzled was directed by Stanley Donen. The pair closed the decade with appearances in the ensemble caper film Monte Carlo or Bust and Richard Lester's The Bed Sitting Room, based on the play by Spike Milligan and John Antrobus. In 1968 and 1969 Moore embarked on two solo comedy ventures, firstly in the film 30 is a Dangerous Age, Cynthia and secondly, on stage, for an Anglicised adaptation of Woody Allen's Play It Again, Sam at the Globe Theatre in London's West End.

In the 1970s, the relationship between Moore and Cook became increasingly strained as the latter's alcoholism began affecting his work. In 1971, however, Cook and Moore took sketches from Not Only....But Also and Goodbye Again, together with new material, to create the stage revue Beyond the Fringe. This show toured Australia in 1972 before transferring to New York City in 1973, re-titled as Good Evening. Cook frequently appeared on and off stage the worse for drink. Nonetheless, the show proved very popular and it won Tony and Grammy Awards.

When the Broadway run of Good Evening ended, Moore stayed on in the U.S. to pursue his film acting ambitions in Hollywood, but the pair reunited to host Saturday Night Live on 24 January 1976 during SNL's first season. They performed a number of their classic stage routines, including "One Leg Too Few" and "Frog and Peach", among others, in addition to participating in some skits with the show's ensemble.

It was during the Broadway run of Good Evening that Cook persuaded Moore to take the humour of Pete and Dud further on long-playing records as Derek and Clive. Chris Blackwell circulated bootleg copies to friends in the music business and the popularity of the recording convinced Cook to release it commercially as Derek and Clive (Live) (1976). Two further "Derek and Clive" albums, Derek and Clive Come Again (1977) and Derek and Clive Ad Nauseam (1978), were later released. The latter was also filmed for a documentary, Derek and Clive Get the Horn. In the film it is clear tensions between the two men were at a breaking point, with Moore at one point walking out of the recording room singing, 'Breaking up is so easy to do.' In 2009, it came to light that, at the time, three separate British police forces had wanted them to be prosecuted under obscenity laws for their "Derek and Clive" comedy recordings.

The last significant appearance for the partnership was in 1978's The Hound of the Baskervilles, where Moore played Dr. Watson to Cook's Sherlock Holmes, as well as three other roles: in drag; as a one-legged man; and at the start and end of the film as a flamboyant and mischievous pianist. He also wrote the film's score. Co-star Terry-Thomas described it as "the most outrageous film I ever appeared in ... there was no magic ... it was bad!". The film was not a success, either  critically or financially.

Moore and Cook eventually reunited for the annual American benefit for the homeless, Comic Relief, in 1987, and again in 1989 for a British audience at the Amnesty International benefit The Secret Policeman's Biggest Ball.

Moore was deeply affected by the death of Cook in 1995, and for weeks would regularly telephone Cook's home in London, just to hear his friend's voice on the telephone answering machine. Moore attended Cook's memorial service in London and, at the time, many people who knew him noted that Moore was behaving strangely and attributed it to grief or drinking. In November 1995, Moore teamed up with friend and humorist Martin Lewis in organising a two-day salute to Cook in Los Angeles that Moore co-hosted with Lewis.

In December 2004 the Channel 4 television station in the United Kingdom broadcast Not Only But Always, a TV film dramatising the relationship between Moore and Cook, although the principal focus of the production was on Cook. Around the same time, the relationship between the two was also the subject of a stage play called Pete and Dud: Come Again by Chris Bartlett and Nick Awde. For this production Moore is the main subject. Set in a chat-show studio in the 1980s, it focuses on Moore's comic and personal relationship with Cook and the directions their careers took after the split of the partnership.

Music
During the 1960s he formed the Dudley Moore Trio, with drummer Chris Karan and bassist Pete McGurk. Following McGurk's suicide in June 1968, Peter Morgan joined the group as his replacement.

Moore's admitted principal musical influences were Oscar Peterson and Erroll Garner. In an interview he recalled the day he finally mastered Garner's unique left-hand strum and was so excited that he walked around for several days with his left hand constantly playing that cadence. His early recordings included "My Blue Heaven", "Lysie Does It", "Poova Nova", "Take Your Time", "Indiana", "Sooz Blooz", "Baubles, Bangles & Beads", "Sad One for George" and "Autumn Leaves". The trio performed regularly on British television, made numerous recordings and had a long-running residency at Peter Cook's London nightclub, the Establishment. Amongst other albums, they recorded The Dudley Moore Trio, Dudley Moore plays The Theme from Beyond the Fringe and All That Jazz, The World of Dudley Moore, The Other Side Of Dudley Moore and Genuine Dud.

Moore was a close friend of record producer Chris Gunning and played piano (uncredited) on the 1969 single "Broken Hearted Pirates" which Gunning produced for Simon Dupree and the Big Sound. In 1976 he played piano on Larry Norman's album In Another Land, in particular on the song The Sun Began to Rain. In 1981 he recorded Smilin' Through with Cleo Laine.

He composed the soundtracks for the films Bedazzled (1967), 30 is a Dangerous Age, Cynthia (1968), Inadmissible Evidence (1968), Staircase (1969), The Hound of the Baskervilles (1978) and Six Weeks (1982), among others.

Later career in film, television and music
In the late 1970s Moore moved to Hollywood, where he had a supporting role in the hit film Foul Play (1978) with Goldie Hawn and Chevy Chase. The following year saw his breakout role in Blake Edwards's 10, which became one of the biggest box-office hits of 1979 and gave him an unprecedented status as a romantic leading man. Moore followed up with the comedy film Wholly Moses!, which was not a major success.

In 1981 Moore appeared in the title role of the comedy Arthur, an even bigger hit than 10. Co-starring Liza Minnelli and Sir John Gielgud, it was both commercially and critically successful, Moore receiving an Oscar nomination for Best Actor, whilst Gielgud won the Best Supporting Actor Oscar for his role as Arthur's stern but compassionate manservant. Moore lost to Henry Fonda (for On Golden Pond). He did, however, win a Golden Globe award for Best Actor in a Musical/Comedy. In the same year, on British television, Moore was the featured guest subject on An Audience With....

His subsequent films, Six Weeks (1982), Lovesick (1983), Romantic Comedy (1983) and Unfaithfully Yours (1984) were only moderate successes. He won another Golden Globe for Best Actor in a Musical/Comedy in 1984, starring in the Blake Edwards directed Micki & Maude, co-starring Amy Irving.

Later films, including Best Defense (1984), Santa Claus: The Movie (1985), Like Father Like Son (1987), Arthur 2: On the Rocks (1988), a sequel to the original, Crazy People (1990), Blame It on the Bellboy (1992) and an animated adaptation of King Kong, were inconsistent in terms of both critical and commercial reception. Moore eventually disowned the Arthur sequel, but, in later years, Cook would tease him by claiming he preferred Arthur 2: On the Rocks to Arthur.

In 1986 he once again hosted Saturday Night Live, albeit without Peter Cook this time.

Moore was the subject of the British This Is Your Life, for a second time, in March 1987 when he was surprised by Eamonn Andrews at his Venice Beach restaurant; he had previously been honoured by the programme in December 1972.

In addition to acting, Moore continued to work as a composer and pianist, writing scores for a number of films and giving piano concerts, which were highlighted by his popular parodies of classical favourites. He appeared as Ko-Ko in Jonathan Miller's production of The Mikado in Los Angeles in March 1988. He appeared on Kenny G's music video "Against Doctor's Orders" from the album Silhouette.  

In 1991 he released the album Songs Without Words and in 1992 Live From an Aircraft Hangar, recorded at London's Royal Albert Hall.

He collaborated with the conductor Sir Georg Solti in 1991 to create a Channel 4 television series, Orchestra!, which was designed to introduce audiences to the symphony orchestra. He later worked with the American conductor Michael Tilson Thomas on a similar television series, Concerto! (1993), likewise designed to introduce audiences to classical music concertos.

Moore appeared in two series for CBS, Dudley (1993) and Daddy's Girls (1994); however, both were cancelled before the end of their run.

Moore had been interviewed for The New York Times in 1987 by the music critic Rena Fruchter, herself an accomplished pianist, and the two became close friends. By 1995 Moore's film career was on the wane and he was having trouble remembering his lines, a problem he had never previously encountered. It was for this reason he was sacked from Barbra Streisand's film The Mirror Has Two Faces. However, his difficulties were, in fact, due to the onset of the medical condition that eventually led to his death. Opting to concentrate on the piano, he enlisted Fruchter as an artistic partner. They performed as a duo in the US and Australia. However, his disease soon started to make itself apparent there as well, as his fingers would not always do what he wanted them to do. Further symptoms such as slurred speech and loss of balance were misinterpreted by the public and the media as a sign of drunkenness. Moore himself was at a loss to explain this. He moved into Fruchter's family home in New Jersey and stayed there for five years; however, this placed a great strain both on her marriage and her friendship with Moore, and she later set him up in the house next door.

Restaurant 
Tony Bill and Dudley Moore founded a restaurant in 1983 (closed in November 2000), 72 Market Street Oyster Bar and Grill, in Venice, California.

Personal life
Moore was married and divorced four times: to actresses Suzy Kendall (15 June 1968 – 15 September 1972), Tuesday Weld (20 September 1975 – 18 July 1980; by whom he had a son Patrick on 26 February 1976), Brogan Lane (21 February 1988 – 1991), and Nicole Rothschild (16 April 1994 – 1998; one son, Nicholas, born on 28 June 1995).

In 1994, Moore was arrested and charged with domestic assault after allegedly assaulting his then-girlfriend and soon-to-be wife, Nicole Rothschild.

He maintained good relationships with Kendall, Weld and Lane. But he expressly prohibited Rothschild from attending his funeral since, at the time his illness became apparent, he was going through a difficult divorce with her while at the same time sharing a Los Angeles house with her and her previous husband.

Illness and death
In April 1997, after spending five days in a New York hospital, Moore was informed that he had calcium deposits in the basal ganglia of his brain and irreversible frontal lobe damage. In September 1997, he underwent quadruple coronary artery bypass surgery in London. He also suffered four strokes.

On 30 September 1999, Moore announced that he was suffering from the terminal degenerative brain disorder progressive supranuclear palsy (PSP), a Parkinson-plus syndrome,
some of the early symptoms being so similar to intoxication that he had been reported as being drunk,

and that the illness had been diagnosed earlier in the year.

Moore died on the morning of 27 March 2002 as a result of pneumonia, secondary to immobility caused by his PSP, in Plainfield, New Jersey, at the age of 66. Rena Fruchter  was holding his hand when he died; she reported his final words were "I can hear the music all around me." Moore was interred at Hillside Cemetery in Scotch Plains, New Jersey. Fruchter later wrote a memoir of their relationship entitled Dudley Moore (Ebury Press, 2004).

Honours and awards
In 1981, Moore won the Golden Globe for Best Actor for his role in Arthur, for which he was also Oscar-nominated. In November 2001, Moore was appointed a Commander of the Order of The British Empire (CBE). Despite his deteriorating condition, he attended the ceremony at Buckingham Palace on 16 November to collect his honour in a wheelchair. It was his last public appearance.

Filmography

Discography

UK chart singles
 "Goodbye-ee", 1965, Peter Cook and Dudley Moore
 "The Ballad of Spotty Muldoon", 1965, Peter Cook and Dudley Moore

Jazz discography
 "Strictly for the Birds" b/w "Duddly Dell", 1961 (Parlophone R 4772)  The Dudley Moore Trio (Derek Hogg, drums; Hugo Boyd, double bass)
 The Other Side of Dudley Moore, 1965 (Decca LK 4732 Mono) The Dudley Moore Trio (Pete McGurk  double bass, Chris Karan  drums)
 Genuine Dud, 1966 (Decca LK 4788 Mono) The Dudley Moore Trio (Pete McGurk  double bass, Chris Karan  drums) [reissued as The World of Dudley Moore, vol 2, 1973]
 From Beyond The Fringe, 1966 (Atlantic RecordsStandard 2 017)
 The Dudley Moore Trio, 1969 (Decca Records (UK) / London Records (US) PS558)
 Dudley Moore plays the Theme from Beyond the Fringe and All That Jazz, 1962 (Atlantic 1403)
 The World of Dudley Moore, (Decca SPA 106)
 The Music of Dudley Moore, (EMI Australia (Cube Records) TOOFA.14-1/2)
 Dudley Down Under, (Cube ICS 13)
 Dudley Moore at the Wavendon Festival, (Black Lion Records BLP 12151)
 Smilin' Through – Cleo Laine and Dudley Moore, (Finesse Records FW 38091)
 "Strictly for the Birds" – Cleo Laine and Dudley Moore, (CBS A 2947)
 The Theme from Beyond The Fringe and All That Jazz, (Collectibles COL 6625)
 Live from an Aircraft Hangar (Martine Avenue Productions MAPI 8486)
 Songs Without Words, 1991 (GRP/BMG LC 6713)
 The First Orchestrations – Dudley Moore and Richard Rodney Bennett, played by John Bassett and his Band, (Harkit Records HRKCD 8054)
 Jazz Jubilee, (Martine Avenue Productions MAPI 1521)
 The Dudley Moore Trio at Sydney Town Hall, 2 May 1978 (with Peter Morgan on bass and Chris Karan on drums). Produced by Peter Wall.
 Today, The Dudley Moore Trio  again with Morgan and Karan (see above) recorded at United Sound, Sydney, in 1971, with some mono tracks added from a 1961 London session. No details.

Comedy discography
 Beyond The Fringe (West End recording) (1961)
 Beyond The Fringe (Broadway recording) (1962)
 Not Only Peter Cook But Also Dudley Moore (1965)
 Once Moore with Cook (1966)
 Peter Cook and Dudley Moore Cordially Invite You to Go to Hell! (1967)
 Goodbye Again (1968)
 Not Only But Also (1971)
 Behind the Fridge (1971) AUS No. 35
 The World of Pete & Dud (1974)
 Good Evening (1974)
 Derek and Clive (Live) (1976)
 Derek and Clive Come Again (1977)
 Derek and Clive Ad Nauseam (1978)

Bibliography
 Dudley Moore (1966). Originals. Arranged as Piano Solos Transcribed from the Decca L.P. 'The Other Side of Dudley Moore'''. Essex Music.

References

Further reading
 Roger Wilmut, From Fringe to Flying Circus: Celebrating a Unique Generation of Comedy 1960–1980, Eyre Methuen Ltd, 1980
 
 
 
 Dudley Moore: An Intimate Portrait, Rena Fruchter, Ebury Press, 2004, .
 Julian Upton, Fallen Stars'', Headpress, 2004.

External links

 "The Films of Dudley Moore", film clip compilation, 5 minutes
 
 
 
 Obituary at CNN.com
 "Affectionately Dudley", 2006 Radio 4 programme

 
1935 births
2002 deaths
Alumni of Magdalen College, Oxford
Best Musical or Comedy Actor Golden Globe (film) winners
English jazz pianists
Commanders of the Order of the British Empire
Deaths from pneumonia in New Jersey
Neurological disease deaths in New Jersey
Deaths from progressive supranuclear palsy
English classical organists
British male organists
English expatriates in the United States
English male film actors
English male comedians
English satirists
English male television actors
Grammy Award winners
People from Dagenham
People from Hammersmith
English people of Scottish descent
20th-century English male actors
21st-century English male actors
Burials at Hillside Cemetery (Scotch Plains, New Jersey)
20th-century classical musicians
20th-century pianists
20th-century English musicians
20th-century English comedians
British male comedy actors
British male jazz musicians
Black Lion Records artists
20th-century British male musicians
Special Tony Award recipients
Dudley Moore Trio members
Male classical organists